{{DISPLAYTITLE:C11H15NO3}}
The molecular formula C11H15NO3 may refer to:

 Anhalamine
 FLEA (psychedelic)
 Methoxymethylenedioxyamphetamine
 Methylenedioxymethoxyamphetamine (MDMEO)
 MMDA-2
 Propoxur